Patriarch Athanasius II may refer to:

 Athanasius II of Alexandria, Patriarch of Alexandria in 490–496
 Athanasius II, Patriarch of Antioch (ruled in 683–686)
 Athanasius II of Constantinople, Ecumenical Patriarch in 1450–1453
 Athanasius II Dabbas, Melkite Greek Patriarch of Antioch in 1611–1619